Borgofranco may refer to:

 Borgofranco d'Ivrea, a municipality in the Metropolitan City of Turin in the Piedmont region of Italy
 Borgofranco sul Po, a municipality in the Province of Mantua in the Lombardy region of Italy